Sindoor Ki Keemat is an Indian Hindi soap opera starring Vaibhavi Hankare and Shehzad Shaikh. The show was premiered on 14 October 2021, and it was aired on Dangal TV Under the Banner of 4 Lions Films. This show is the remake of the Sun TV's Tamil television series Roja.

Plot 
The story starts with a girl named Mishri who grew up in an orphanage. She meets a criminal lawyer named Arjun Awasthi, the son of Prathap Awasthi. Arjun hates love and marriage and he also dislikes Mishri. Mishri hates him because of his behavior. Another character called Priya is Mishri's friend, and is a mercenary and corrupt person who works for a criminal called Saakshi. She hates Mishri and her adopted father Swamiji, and Mishri slaps her.

In revenge against Mishri and Swamiji, Priya and Saakshi kill a man who turns out to be an ex-partner of Priya. Mishri's father is thought to have carried out the murder, and is imprisoned. During all this, a lawyer, Brij Awasthi, is looking for his long-lost daughter Anu. This turns out to be Mishri. In temple, Mishri meets her biological father Brij, and they fail to recognize each other.

She decides to find her daughter Anu. But she learns that she is the Anu who is the daughter of Brij Awasthi, she decided to tell her father but that Priya has stolen her identity and lived in the same home but Priya's work is to pose as the Anu and steal the property of Awasthi family so that she can become rich, but she fails to inform him. Arjun's family decided to engagement with Priya (masquerading as "Fake Anu") to Arjun so that she can steal the property of the family.

Arjun meets Mishri and says that he can release her father from jail and he can bring Priya and Saakshi to jail. But, they have one condition that she wants to agree to marry him in a one-year contract marriage so that he can take the Mishri's case. She agrees that deal and marries him. But his family members Including his Daadi Annapoorna Awasthi and her father Brij Awasthi dislikes her and blames her for she married Arjun and her daughter Priya/Anu became a widower. His father Prathap Awasthi, His mother Kalpana and his brother Ashwin also supports her. But Brij's sister Yashoda and his henpecked husband Ballu also dislikes her. And they teamed with Priya to kick Mishri out of the house. But it always fails after Arjun saves her. Dadi's older sister, Bhagawati arrives and supports Mishri.

At the dramatic events, Mishri's ex-boyfriend comes and plans to kill her and his family with the help of Priya. One day, she saves Daadi from falling the cupboard which causes Daadi to misunderstand her and puts a shame on her. And her boyfriend kidnaps her. Who thinks that she had cheated to him. But it was defeated by Arjun and saves Mishri, and Priya pretended to be injured in front of the family and she says that Mishri broke her car and beat her which causes her to break her hand. Daadi files the case against Mishri which causes her to arrest by police. But Arjun threatens Priya by watching the video Where Priya broke her car by her own which was captured in CCTV camera in Arjun's phone and he says that if she says will not release Mishri from going to jail he will release this video in court. A scared Priya tells the court that She is Innocent which causes the court giving her a bail.

One Day, at the house Annapoorna, Brij, Priya/Anu, Yashoda, Ballu turning Mishri into a Servant at the party at Arjun's house which causes a disheartened to Kalpana, Ashwin and Bhagawati. At the party, Mishri accidentally hits into the women which causes her to dress dirty. She scolds Mishri, But Arjun says to her that she is his wife and not a servant in the house. Mishri also accused for stealing the same women's thing. But the thief is Yashoda. He knows that Yashoda was the one who steals her things so that she can expel Mishri from the house. Prathap knows about this and slaps Yashoda.

At night, Priya listens the conversation between Arjun and Mishri. She later learns that Mishri and Arjun are not married.

Another day, Brij goes into an accident which causes Mishri locks into the room in the hospital which was done by Priya and misunderstands Mishri and they think that Mishri locks Priya to kill her. But in the hospital, Mishri listens the conversation between doctor and the nurse it is revealed that Priya's blood is not matching on Brij's Blood. Another thing is Mishri's Blood is matching with Brij's blood she donates her blood to Brij's Blood and she finally says to them that Priya/Anu's blood is not matching on Brij's blood.

At the Dadi's birthday celebration Priya takes a plan to ruin Mishri's Dadi's birthday so that everyone thinks that it is Mishri's work but it also fails after they see the video of Priya and Mishri's conversation. It is believed that it was Priya who ruined her Dadi and all of her family's photos with black ink, so Daadi slaps her. And then she locks Arjun into the freezer. but it was saved by Mishri itself.

Arjun's mother, Kalpana, learns the truth about their marriage and she expels Mishri from the house which causes Daadi, Priya, Yashoda, Ballu, Brij, and Prathap feel happy and they decide to have Arjun marry Priya. Mishri hires a new lawyer named Mohan, who is Arjun's junior and his enemy. Mohan had a feeling for Mishri. But, Mohan finds about this and locks Mishri into the water tank and saved by Arjun and they reunite and bring Mishri into the house.

Arjun and Mishri's one-year contract marriage was terminated and then they fall in love and live as husband and wife.

Cast

Main 
 Vaibhavi Hankare as Anu "Mishri" Awasthi – Brij and Vidya's long-lost daughter; Swami's foster daughter; Arjun's wife (2021–present)
 Shehzad Shaikh as Arjun Awasthi – A criminal lawyer; Pratap and Kalpana's elder son; Ashwin's brother; Anu's husband (2021–present)

Recurring 
 Prerna Sharma as Priya – Fake Anu; Anu's rival (2021–2022)
 Chandni Bhagwanani as Kamini – Arjun's one sided obsessive lover (2022)
 Jyotsna Chandola as Priya/Anamika (After Plastic Surgery) - Ashwin's wife (2022–present)
 Prateik Chaudhary as Ashwin Awasthi – Pratap and Kalpana's younger son; Arjun's brother; Anu's cousin (2021–present)
 Shahab Khan as Swami – Anu's foster father; founder of the orphanage (2021–present)
 Ashita Dhawan as Yashoda Awasthi – Annapurna's younger daughter; Vidya and Pratap's sister; Arjun, Ashwin and Anu's aunt (2021– present)
 Amit Koushik as Pratap Awasthi – Annapurna's son; Vidya and Yashoda's brother; Kalpana's husband; Arjun and Ashwin's father (2021–present)
 Jaswinder Gardener as Kalpana Awasthi – Pratap's wife; Arjun and Ashwin's mother (2021–present)
 Rajshri Rani / Dolly Sohi as Vidya Awasthi – Annapurna's elder daughter; Pratap and Yashoda's sister; Brij's wife; Anu's mother (2021) / (2022–present) (presumed dead)
 Siraj Mustafa Khan as Brij Awasthi – A lawyer and businessman; Vidya's husband; Anu's father (2021–present)
 Madhavi Gogate / Kiran Bhargava as Annapurna Awasthi – Matriarch of Awasthis'; Bhagwati's sister; Vidya, Pratap and Yashoda's mother; Arjun, Ashwin and Anu's grandmother (2021– present)
 Vijay Singh Parmar as Ballu – Yashoda and Priya's partner (2021–present)
 Nisha Nagpal as Sakshi – Priya's ally (2021)
 Meena Naithani as Bhagwati – Annapurna's sister; Vidya, Yashoda and Pratap's aunt (2021–present)

Special appearances 
 Rani Chatterjee

Cameo appearances
Aleya Ghosh as Paro Shankar Rana from Ishq Ki Dastaan - Naagmani (2022)
Shruti Anand as Ruchita Nihar Goyal from Mann Sundar (2023)

Production 
The filming of the show was started in October 2021. Producer Gul Khan cast the actress Vaibhavi Hankare as well as the television actor Shehzad Shaikh. They also cast Prerna Sharma. Later Madhavi Gogte was replaced by Kiran Bhargava as Dadi.

Adaptations

References

External links 
 Official Website
 

 Sindoor Ki Keemat on Dangal Play

2021 Indian television series debuts
Indian television series
Indian television soap operas
Serial drama television series
Hindi-language television shows
Indian drama television series
Television shows set in Mumbai
Dangal TV original programming
Hindi-language television series based on Tamil-language television series